This article lists all the Bosnia and Herzegovina national football team results between 1995 and 2019.

For results after 2019, see Bosnia and Herzegovina national football team results (2020–present).

Results

1995

1996

1997

1998

1999

2000

2001

2002

2003

2004

2005

2006

2007

2008

2009

2010

2011

2012

2013

2014

2015

2016

2017

2018

2019

See also

Bosnia and Herzegovina national football team statistics
List of international goals scored by Edin Džeko
The Bosnian footballer of the year award – Idol of the nation

References

External links
FIFA.com
FS
sport.becka-raja.at

Results
Bosnia and Herzegovina national football team results